The Balanophoraceae are a subtropical to tropical family of obligate parasitic flowering plants, notable for their unusual development and formerly obscure affinities. In the broadest circumscription, the family consists of 16 genera. Alternatively, three genera may be split off into the segregate family Mystropetalaceae.

The plants are normally found in moist inland forests growing on tree roots and have an above ground inflorescence with the overall appearance of a fungus, composed of numerous minute flowers. The inflorescences develop inside the tuberous underground part of the plant, before rupturing it and surfacing. The plants are monoecious, or dioecious, and the fruits are indehiscent drupes or nuts. The underground portion, which attaches itself to the host, looks like a tuber, and is not a proper root system. The plants contain no chlorophyll. Balanophora means "bearing an acorn" (from the shape of the female inflorescence).

Taxonomy
In the classification system of Dahlgren, the Balanophoraceae were placed in the order Balanophorales in the superorder Balanophoriflorae (also called Balanophoranae). The APG IV system of 2016 (unchanged from the APG III system of 2009), also recognizes this family, including it in the order Santalales, where it was also placed by the Cronquist system (1981).

A 2015 molecular phylogenetic suggested that as circumscribed in the APG IV system, Balanophoraceae is not monophyletic. The authors of the study proposed dividing Balanophoraceae s.l. into Balanophoraceae s.s. and the family Mystropetalaceae, containing three monotypic genera, Dactylanthus, Hachettea and Mystropetalon. The cladogram below shows the relationships obtained (using the broad APG IV circumscriptions of Olacaceae and Santalaceae).

Genera
, the broadly circumscribed family was accepted by Plants of the World Online, which included the following genera. Other sources place three of the genera in the segregate family Mystropetalaceae.

 Balanophora 
 Chlamydophytum 
 Corynaea 
 Dactylanthus  [Mystropetalaceae]
 Ditepalanthus 
 Hachettea  [Mystropetalaceae]
 Helosis 
 Langsdorffia 
 Lathrophytum 
 Lophophytum 
 Mystropetalon  [Mystropetalaceae]
 Ombrophytum 
 Rhopalocnemis 
 Sarcophyte 
 Scybalium 
 Thonningia

References

External links
 
 
 Balanophoraceae at Parasitic plants
 Mystropetalaceae at Parasitic plants

 
Eudicot families